Farhad Pourgholami (born December 4, 1962 in Bandar Anzali) is a former Iranian footballer and manager.

Pourgholami was assistant head coach to Mohammad Ahmadzadeh in Iran national under-20 football team. After Ahmadzadeh was appointed as Malavan's head coach, Pourgholami was chosen as his first team coach. Later he was appointed as Malavan Youth team. After Ahmadzadeh's resignation as Malavan head coach, he was appointed as caretaker head coach and after three weeks, he was signed a contract until the end of 2011–12 season.

Honors

Player
Hazfi Cup
Winners (2): 1987, 1990
Runner Up (3): 1988, 1989, 1991

Manager
Hazfi Cup
Runner Up (1): 2010–11

References

Living people
1962 births
Iranian footballers
Iranian football managers
Malavan players
People from Bandar-e Anzali
Association football midfielders
Sportspeople from Gilan province
Malavan F.C. managers